The Monmouth Stakes is a Grade III American Thoroughbred horse race for horses aged three years old over a distance of one and one-eighth miles on the turf held annually in late May or early June at Monmouth Park Racetrack in Oceanport, New Jersey.  The event currently carries a purse of $150,000.

History
The inaugural running of the event was on September 13, 2008 when Monmouth Park created the Monmouth Stakes when IEAH Stables said they wanted their Dual Classic  winner, Big Brown, to compete in a turf race in the middle of September. (Although Belmont Park was willing to create a race, that never materialized. Philadelphia Park used the Presidents Cup to entice Big Brown to race there.)

The following year the event was moved to June.

In 2010 the event was classified as Grade III.

The event was not held in 2016.

Records
Speed  record:
 1:45.93 - Data Link (2012)

Margins:
 lengths – Devamani (FR) (2021)

Most wins by a horse
 2 - Money Multiplier (2017, 2018)
 2 - Almanaar (GB) (2019, 2020)

Most wins by a jockey:
 4 - Joe Bravo (2014, 2018, 2019, 2020)

Most wins by a trainer:
 6 - Chad C. Brown (2017, 2018, 2019, 2020, 2021, 2022)

Most wins by an owner:
 2 - Shadwell Stable (2019, 2020)

Winners

See also
 List of American and Canadian Graded races

References

Turf races in the United States
Graded stakes races in the United States
Open mile category horse races
2008 establishments in New Jersey
Recurring sporting events established in 2008
Monmouth Park Racetrack
Horse races in New Jersey
Grade 3 stakes races in the United States